As Salafiyah District is a district of the Raymah Governorate, Yemen. As of 2003, the district had a population of 82,570 inhabitants.

References

Districts of Raymah Governorate